Kathleen "Kate" Elizabeth Walsh has been the president and chief executive officer of Boston Medical Center since 2010 (replacing Elaine Ullian, an adjunct clinical associate professor of health law, policy & management at the Boston University School of Public Health and a member of the boards of the Federal Reserve Bank of Boston.  Before that, Walsh was the executive vice president and chief operating officer of Brigham and Women’s Hospital for five years.

Walsh also served as the chief operating officer for Novartis Institutes for Biomedical Research and at Massachusetts General Hospital in positions including senior vice president of medical services and the MGH Cancer Center.

Walsh received her Bachelor of Arts degree (1977) and a master’s degree in public health (1979) from Yale University.  Walsh is a member of Yale’s board of trustees.

She lives in Wellesley, Massachusetts.

References

Novartis people
American chief operating officers
Boston University School of Public Health faculty
American women chief executives
Federal Reserve Bank people
Yale School of Public Health alumni
People from Wellesley, Massachusetts
Massachusetts General Hospital people
American health care chief executives
Year of birth missing (living people)
Living people
American women academics
21st-century American women